Flamin' Groovies Now is a studio album by The Flamin' Groovies, released in 1978. It was produced by Dave Edmunds, and marked a resurgence of the San Francisco band. It brought them to international audiences informed by the post-punk ethic of simplicity that chimed with their classic West Coast melodic pop.

Track listing

Personnel
Flamin' Groovies
 Cyril Jordan - guitar, vocals, mellotron
 Chris Wilson - guitar, vocals, harpsichord, percussion
 Mike Wilhelm - guitar
 George Alexander - bass, vocals, percussion
 David Wright - drums, percussion
 Dave Edmunds - piano, guitar on 5; piano, vocals on 8

References

1978 albums
Flamin' Groovies albums
Albums produced by Dave Edmunds
Sire Records albums
Albums recorded at Rockfield Studios